123rd meridian may refer to:

123rd meridian east, a line of longitude east of the Greenwich Meridian
123rd meridian west, a line of longitude west of the Greenwich Meridian